Matherville is an unincorporated community located in Wayne County, Mississippi, United States. Matherville is located in the northeast corner of Wayne County, just to the west of the state of Alabama.

Notes

Unincorporated communities in Wayne County, Mississippi
Unincorporated communities in Mississippi